Ester Maria Edström (5 September 1892 – 30 June 1945) was a Swedish diver who competed in the 1912 Summer Olympics. She was born in Västerås.

In 1912 she was eliminated in the first round of the 10 metre platform competition.

References

External links
Ester Edström's profile at Sports Reference.com

1892 births
1945 deaths
Swedish female divers
Olympic divers of Sweden
Divers at the 1912 Summer Olympics
Sportspeople from Västerås